Akland is a village in Risør municipality in Agder county, Norway. The village is located at the southwestern end of the Søndeledfjorden. The village sits at the junction of the European route E18 highway, the Norwegian County Road 416, and the Norwegian County Road 418.

References

Villages in Agder
Risør